The Nankan River is a river in northern Taiwan. It flows through Taoyuan City for 31 km.

See also
List of rivers in Taiwan

References

Rivers of Taiwan
Landforms of Taoyuan City